"Jungle Man" is a song by the American rock band Red Hot Chili Peppers from their 1985 album, Freaky Styley. It was released as the album's first single, however failed to chart. A music video released around the same time of the album's release on August 16, 1985. The band couldn't get a proper music video released, so manager Lindy Goetz used different clips of live performances of the song from May 1985 to January 1986 edited together with the album version of the song playing on top. The song has not been performed live since 1988.

In his autobiography "Scar Tissue", Anthony Kiedis reveals the song is an ode to his friend Flea: "this half man, half beast born in the belly of the volcano in Australia and using his thumb as a conductor of thunder on the bass".

Jason Birchmeier of AllMusic considered "Jungle Man" to be one of the highlights from the album.

Track listing
Promo 12" version
"Jungle Man" (album version)
"Nevermind" (album version)
"Stranded"
"Hollywood (Africa)" (7" version)

Personnel 

 Anthony Kiedis - lead vocals
 Flea - backing vocals, bass guitar

 Hillel Slovak - backing vocals, guitar
 Cliff Martinez - drums
 unknown - backing vocals

Production 

 George Clinton - producer
 Greg Ward - mixing

References

Red Hot Chili Peppers songs
1985 singles
Songs written by Anthony Kiedis
Songs written by Flea (musician)
1985 songs
Songs written by Cliff Martinez
Songs written by Jack Sherman (guitarist)

pt:Jungle Man